Neath Brooklyn Bridge is a 1942 film released by Monogram Pictures. It is the eleventh installment in the East Side Kids series and one of the more dramatic films of the series, released at a time when they were making lighter, more humorous fare. The film is now in public domain and can be downloaded legally from numerous web sites.

Plot 
This time around, the East Side Kids, a gang of well-meaning young rough-necks in New York, are pulled into a murder mystery. They manage to rescue a young girl by the name of Sylvia from her violent stepfather Morley's abuse. Soon after, the stepfather is killed by a gangster called McGaffey for interfering with his racketeering operation by stealing his money.

Sylvia has taken refuge in the gang's hideout. One of the Kids, Danny, returns to her stepfather's apartment to bring some clothes for her. He is arrested by the police, suspected of the murder.

When McGaffey hears about the arrest he makes the gang a proposition. In exchange for the actual chair leg used by Mugs, president of the Kids, to hit Morley when the gang saved Sylvia, with Mugs' fingerprints, he wants them to break into a warehouse for him.

Danny fails to explain to his policeman brother how the killing of Morley happened. A former member of the Kids, Rusty, who is a sailor, comes to visit the boys in their hour of need. It turns out Sylvia's paralyzed grandfather had been in the apartment and had seen the murder when it happened. He can still communicate with the world through blinking. Rusty discovers that the grandfather blinks morse code, and interprets it, revealing that McGaffey is the killer.

Mugs comes forward, telling the rest of the gang about McGaffey's proposition. They decide to go to the warehouse, and Rusty takes Sylvia to the police station to tell them who the killer is and to get Danny out of jail. The Kids break into the warehouse by driving a truck through the doors and a brawl ensues. The police arrive at the scene and McGaffey and the rest of the gangsters are arrested.

Cast

The East Side Kids
Leo Gorcey as Muggs McGinnis
Bobby Jordan as Danny Lyons
Huntz Hall as Glimpy
Sunshine Sammy Morrison as Scruno
Stanley Clements as Stash
Bobby Stone as Skinny

Remaining cast
Gabriel Dell as Skid
Noah Beery Jr. as Rusty
Marc Lawrence as McGaffey
Anne Gillis as Sylvia
Dave O'Brien as Sergeant Lyons 
Jack Raymond as Sniffy
Betty Wells as Dancer
Dewey Robinson as Captain
Patsy Moran as Mrs. Glimpy, Glimpy's mom
Jack Mulhall as Sergeant
Bud Osborne as Morley
J. Arthur Young as "Bright Eyes"
Franklyn Farnum as Policeman (uncredited)
Jack Kenney as Police Officer Kenny (uncredited)
Frank Moran as Mike, bartender (uncredited)
George Morrell as Soup Customer (uncredited)
'Snub' Pollard as Soup Customer (uncredited)
Betty Sinclair as Dress Saleswoman (uncredited)

References

External links 
 
 

1942 films
American black-and-white films
Films directed by Wallace Fox
Monogram Pictures films
1942 comedy films
Films produced by Sam Katzman
American comedy films
East Side Kids
1940s American films